UMFA may refer to:
 Ungmennafélag Álftaness, a multi-sports club in Iceland
 Ungmennafélagið Afturelding, a multi-sports club in Iceland, commonly known as Afturelding
 United Minorities Front, Assam, a former regional political party in Assam, India
 University of Manitoba Faculty Association (UMFA), Canada 
 Utah Museum of Fine Arts, United States